David Collins (born 1912, date of death unknown) was a Scottish footballer who played for Dumbarton and Morton.

References

1912 births
Year of death missing
Scottish footballers
Dumbarton F.C. players
Scottish Football League players
Greenock Morton F.C. players
Association football wingers
Sportspeople from Dumbarton
Footballers from West Dunbartonshire